Anna Maria Fino is an Italian mathematician specializing in differential geometry, complex geometry, and Lie groups. She is a professor of mathematics in the Giuseppe Peano Department of Mathematics at the University of Turin, and founding editor-in-chief of the journal Complex Manifolds.

Education and career
Fino earned a laurea in mathematics in 1992 from the University of Turin. She completed her Ph.D. in 1997 through the Genoa-Turin University Consortium, with a dissertation Geometria e topologia degli spazi omogenei [Geometry and topology of homogeneous spaces] supervised by Simon Salamon.

She remained as a researcher at the University of Turin until 2005, when she became an associate professor. She earned a habilitation in 2013 and was promoted to full professor in 2015.

She has been editor-in-chief of Complex Manifolds since 2014 when it first began publication, as part of De Gruyter's "Emerging Science Journals" line of open-access journals.

References

External links
Home page

Year of birth missing (living people)
Living people
Italian mathematicians
Italian women mathematicians
University of Turin alumni
Academic staff of the University of Turin